Microgobius is a genus of gobies native  to the Pacific and Atlantic coasts of the Americas.

Species
There are currently 15 recognized species in this genus:
 Microgobius brevispinis Ginsburg, 1939 (Balboa goby)
 Microgobius carri Fowler, 1945 (Seminole goby)
 Microgobius crocatus Birdsong, 1968
 Microgobius curtus Ginsburg, 1939
 Microgobius cyclolepis C. H. Gilbert, 1890 (Roundscale goby)
 Microgobius emblematicus (D. S. Jordan & C. H. Gilbert, 1882) (Emblem goby)
 Microgobius erectus Ginsburg, 1938 (Erect goby)
 Microgobius gulosus (Girard, 1858) (Clown goby)
 Microgobius meeki Evermann & M. C. Marsh, 1899
 Microgobius microlepis Longley & Hildebrand, 1940 (Banner goby)
 Microgobius miraflorensis C. H. Gilbert & Starks, 1904 (Miraflores goby)
 Microgobius signatus Poey, 1876
 Microgobius tabogensis Meek & Hildebrand, 1928 (Taboga goby)
 Microgobius thalassinus (D. S. Jordan & C. H. Gilbert, 1883) (Green goby)
 Microgobius urraca Tornabene, Van Tassell & D. R. Robertson, 2012 (Dark-finned sand goby)

References

Gobiidae